David Batchelor (born 1955 in Dundee) is a Scottish artist and writer.

Life and work

David Batchelor studied Fine Art at Trent Polytechnic, Nottingham (1975–8), and Cultural Theory at the Centre for Contemporary Cultural Studies, Birmingham University (1978–80). He has exhibited widely in the UK, continental Europe, the United States and Latin America; written two books, Minimalism (1997) and Chromophobia (2000); is the editor of Colour (2008); and contributed to a number of journals including Artscribe, Frieze (magazine), and Artforum. David was a member of Tate Britain Council from 2002–5, an advisory body on development and programming at Tate Britain.

He has shown work internationally in many exhibitions including the British Art Show at SNGMA in Edinburgh, Days Like These: Tate Triennial of Contemporary Art at Tate Britain, the 26th São Paulo Biennale, Extreme Abstraction at the Albright-Knox Art Gallery in Buffalo, the Folkestone Triennial in Folkestone and Color Chart: Reinventing Color, 1950 to Today at the Museum of Modern Art in New York City and Tate Liverpool.

David Batchelor has made colourful lightbox installations using bits and pieces salvaged from the streets of London.  Batchelor takes industrial debris – trolleys, shelving units, factory scrap – and transforms them into frames to hold assemblages of neon, perspex and found shopfront signs.

Two of his works are held in the Tate collection. He is the brother of Buddhist scholar and author Stephen Batchelor.

References

Bibliography
Batchelor, David, Found Monochromes, Ridinghouse: London, 2010
Batchelor, David (ed.), Colour, Whitechapel: London/MIT Press: Boston, 2008
 Batchelor, David and Briony Fer, Unplugged, Talbot Rice Gallery: Edinburgh, 2007 
Batchelor, David, Chromophobia, Reaktion Books: London, 2000

External links
David Batchelor's website
Information about David Batchelor on ArtFacts.Net
David Batchelor – Tate Collection
David Batchelor – Saatchi Gallery
David Batchelor – Galeria Leme
David Batchelor – Staff profile at the Royal College of Art
Batchelor's work on the London Underground
David Batchelor's work for Archway Investigations and Responses

1955 births
Living people
Scottish contemporary artists
Scottish sculptors
Scottish male sculptors
People from Dundee
Artists from Dundee
Writers from Dundee